is a Japanese video game developer, founded on 26 June 1992. Its current president, Toshiaki Ōta, previously worked at Toaplan as one of the six original team members and head of software development.

Some of their most popular games were released for Sony's PlayStation console, including the Battle Arena Toshinden series, early Choro Q games and Guardian's Crusade. Tamsoft has also worked on the PlayStation 2 port of Sega's Virtua Tennis 2 and Itadaki Street 3 for Enix, as well as several games in D3 Publisher's Simple 2000 series. Some other famous series are Dream Club, Oneechanbara and Senran Kagura.

List of Tamsoft games

PlayStation

Full Price
Steam Gear * Mash
Abalaburn
Knight & Baby
North America: Guardian's Crusade
Block Kuzushi 2
Toshinden
North America/Europe: Battle Arena Toshinden
Toshinden Plus
Toshinden 2
North America/Europe: Battle Arena Toshinden 2
Toshinden 3
North America/Europe: Battle Arena Toshinden 3
Toshinden Subaru
Europe: Toshinden 4
Choro Q
Europe: Penny Racers
Choro Q 2
Choro Q 3

Simple 1500 Series
Simple 1500 Series Hello Kitty Vol.1: Hello Kitty Bowling
Simple 1500 Series Hello Kitty Vol.2: Hello Kitty Illust Puzzle
Simple 1500 Series Hello Kitty Vol.3: Hello Kitty Block Kuzushi
Simple 1500 Series Vol.13: The Race
North America: Racing
Europe: Pro Racer
Simple 1500 Series Vol.14: The Block Kuzushi
Simple 1500 Series Vol.18: The Bowling
North America: Bowling
Simple 1500 Series Vol.45: The Block Kuzushi 2
Europe: Block Buster

PlayStation 2

Full Price
Dog of Bay (Marvelous Entertainment, 2000)
D.N.A.: Dark Native Apostle (Hudson Soft, 2001)
Europe: D.N.A.: Dark Native Apostle (Virgin Interactive Entertainment, 2002)
Ore ga Kantoku da! (Enix, 2000)
Ore ga Kantoku da! Vol 2 (Enix, 2002)
Itadaki Street 3 (Enix, 2002)
Power Smash 2 (Sega, 2002)
North America: Sega Sports Tennis (Sega, 2002)
Europe: Virtua Tennis 2 (Sega/Acclaim, 2002)
Drift Champ (Hudson Soft, 2002)
Makai Tensho (D3 Publisher, 2003)
Taxi Rider (D3 Publisher, 2005)

Simple 2000 Series
Simple 2000 Series Vol.5: The Block Kuzushi Hyper
Europe: Bust-a-Bloc
Simple 2000 Series Vol.7: The Boxing
Europe: Boxing Champions
Simple 2000 Series Vol.20: The Dungeon RPG: Shinobu ~Mamono no Sumu Shiro~
Europe: Eternal Quest
Simple 2000 Series Vol.24: The Bowling Hyper
Europe: Bowling Xciting
Simple 2000 Series Vol.27: The Pro Yakyuu ~2003 Pennant Race~
Simple 2000 Series Vol.30: The Street Baske 3on3
Europe: Basketball Xciting
Simple 2000 Series Vol.47: The Kessen Sekigahara
Europe: Shogun's Blade
Simple 2000 Series Vol.48: The Taxi ~Utenshu ha Kimida~
Europe: Taxi Rider
Simple 2000 Series Vol.50: The Daibijin
Europe: Demolition Girl
Simple 2000 Series Vol.51: The Senkan
Europe: Iron Sea
Simple 2000 Series Vol.54: The Daikaijuu
Europe: Deep Water
Simple 2000 Series Vol.55: The Catfight: Onna Neko Densetsu
Europe: Fighting Angels
Simple 2000 Series Vol.57: The Pro Yakyuu 2004
Europe: Baseball Mania (Cancelled)
Simple 2000 Series Vol.61: The Oneechanbara
Europe: Zombie Zone
Simple 2000 Series Vol.63: The Suiei Taikai
Europe: Party Girls
Simple 2000 Series Vol.65: The Kyonshi Panic
Europe: Zombie Attack
Simple 2000 Series Vol.68: The Tousou Highway
Europe: Car Race Challenge
Simple 2000 Series Vol.73: The Saiyuutou Saruden
Europe: Monkey King (Unconfirmed)
Simple 2000 Series Vol.79: The Party Quiz
Simple 2000 Series Vol.80: The Oneechampuruu: ~The Oneechan Special Chapter~
Europe: Zombie Hunters
Simple 2000 Series Vol.87: The Senko (The Nadeshiko)
Europe: Dragon Sisters
Simple 2000 Series Vol.90: The Oneechanbara 2
Simple 2000 Series Vol.101: The Oneechanpon ~The Oneechanbara 2 Special Chapter~
Europe: Zombie Hunters 2
Simple 2000 Series Vol.102: The Hohei ~Senjou no Inutachi~
Europe: Covert Command
Simple 2000 Series Vol.106: The Block Kuzushi Quest ~DragonKingdom~
Simple 2000 Series Vol.109: The Taxi 2 ~Untenshi ha Yappari Kimi da!~
Simple 2000 Series Vol.110: The Tousou Prisoner ~Los City Shinjitsu Heno 10 Jikan~
Simple 2000 Series Vol.112: The Tousou Highway 2 ~Road Warrior 2050~
Simple 2000 Series Vol.113: The Tairyou Jigoku
Simple 2000 Series Vol.114: The Jo'okappichi Torimonochou ~Oharuchan GOGOGO!~
Simple 2000 Series Vol.118: The Ochimusha ~Ikaebu Samurai Toujou~
Simple 2000 Series Vol.120: The Saigo no Nihonhei ~Utsukushiki Kokudo Dakkan Sakusen~
Simple 2000 Series Ultimate Vol.3: Saisoku! Zokukuruma King
Europe: Maxxed Out Racing
Simple 2000 Series Ultimate Vol.6: Love*Upper!
Europe: Heartbeat Boxing
Simple 2000 Series Ultimate Vol.7: Saikyou! Shirobai King
Europe: Police Chase Down
Simple 2000 Series Ultimate Vol.13: Kurusou! Tansha King
Europe: Motorbike King
Simple 2000 Series Ultimate Vol.15: Love*Pingpong!
Europe: Pink Pong
Simple 2000 Series Ultimate Vol.18: Love*Aerobi
Europe: Fitness Fun (TBC)
Simple 2000 Series Ultimate Vol.21: Kenka Joutou! Yankee Banchou
Europe: Street Boyz
Simple 2000 Series Ultimate Vol.24: Makai Tensho (re-release)
Simple 2000 Series Ultimate Vol.25: Chou Saisoku! Zokukuruma King BU no BU

PlayStation Portable

Full Price
Dream Club Portable
Ikki Tousen: Eloquent Fist
Ikki Tousen: Xross Impact
OneChanbara Portable

Simple 2500 Portable!! Series
Simple 2500 Portable!! Series Vol. 5: The Block Kuzushi Quest ~DragonKingdom~
Simple 2500 Portable!! Series Vol. 12: The Hohei 2: Senyuu yo, Sakini Ike
Simple 2500 Portable!! Series Vol. 13: The Akuma Hunters – Exorsister

Xbox 360
Dream Club
Dream Club Zero
Onechanbara: Bikini Samurai Squad

Wii
Alien Crush Returns
Family Party: 30 Great Games
Family Party: Fitness Fun
OneChanbara: Bikini Zombie Slayers
Simple 2000 Wii Series Vol. 2: The Party Game

Nintendo DS

Full Price
Koisuru Purin!: Koi ha Daibouken! Dr. Kanmi no Yabou!?
Norimono Oukoku: You! Unten Shichainayo!
Tokyo Beat Down
Unknown Soldier: Mokuba no Houkou
Koisuru Purin! Koi ha Daibouken! Dr. Kanmi no Yabou!?
Witch's Wish

Simple DS Series
Simple DS Series Vol. 20: The Senkan
Simple DS Series Vol. 21: The Hohei
Simple DS Series Vol. 22: The AgeAge Zeroyon Midnight
Simple DS Series Vol. 29: The Sports Daishuugou
Simple DS Series Vol. 34: The Haishasan
Simple DS Series Vol. 39: The Shouboutai

PlayStation 3
Natsuiro High School: Seishun Hakusho

Nintendo 3DS
Senran Kagura Burst
Senran Kagura 2: Deep Crimson

PlayStation Vita
Gintama Rumble

Full price
Dream Club Zero Portable
Senran Kagura Shinovi Versus
Hyperdimension Neptunia: Producing Perfection
Hyperdimension Neptunia U: Action Unleashed
Senran Kagura: Estival Versus
MegaTagmension Blanc + Neptune VS Zombies
Drive Girls

Simple V Series
Simple V Series Vol. 1: The Docodemo Gal Mahjong
Simple V Series Vol. 2: The Tōsō Highway Fullboost: Nagoya–Tokyo Gekisō 4-jikan

PlayStation 4
Onechanbara Z2: Chaos
Utawarerumono: ZAN
Senran Kagura: Estival Versus
Natsuiro High School: Seishun Hakusho
School Girl/Zombie Hunter
Senran Kagura: Peach Beach Splash
Cyberdimension Neptunia: 4 Goddesses Online
Gintama Rumble
Hinomaruko
Onechanbara Origin
Captain Tsubasa: Rise of New Champions
Neptunia x Senran Kagura: Ninja Wars
Melty Blood: Type Lumina

PlayStation 5
Utawarerumono: ZAN

PC
Hyperdimension Neptunia U: Action Unleashed
Senran Kagura Shinovi Versus
Onechanbara Z2: Chaos
MegaTagmension Blanc + Neptune VS Zombies
Senran Kagura: Estival Versus
Cyberdimension Neptunia: 4 Goddesses Online
School Girl/Zombie Hunter
Senran Kagura: Peach Beach Splash
Onechanbara Origin
Captain Tsubasa: Rise of New Champions
Melty Blood: Type Lumina

Nintendo Switch
Captain Tsubasa: Rise of New Champions
Hinomaruko
Melty Blood: Type Lumina

Xbox One
Melty Blood: Type Lumina

References

External links
Tamsoft Homepage
D3 Publisher

Software companies based in Tokyo
Video game companies established in 1992
Video game companies of Japan
Japanese companies established in 1992
Video game development companies